Mahaygya is an Indian television show broadcast on Sony TV in 1997–1998. Written, produced and directed by Anil Chaudhary, the political drama starred Manohar Singh, Rohini Hattangadi, Goving Namdeo, supported by Ananya Khare, Murali Sharma, Kumud Mishra and others.

Premise 
Set in the small central-Indian town, the story unfolds with an average, politically inexperienced but practical and shrewd woman, Vimla Pandey (Rohini Hattangadi) winning the Parliament election, defeating seasoned politician Thakur Bhanu Pratap Singh (Manohar Singh). Vimla Pandey is on the warpath to settle old dues with the Thakur.

Cast 
 Manohar Singh as Thakur Bhanu Pratap Singh
 Govind Namdeo as Chhote Thakur
 Rohini Hattangadi as Vimla Pandey
 Ananya Khare (credited as Preeti Khare)
 Murali Sharma
 Kumud Mishra

References

External links 
 Watch a scene from Mahayagya on YouTube

1997 Indian television series debuts
1998 Indian television series endings
Sony Entertainment Television original programming